Maria Kovrigina (1910–1995) was a Russian physician who served as the minister of health between 1953 and 1959. She was the only women who headed the ministry in the Soviet Union.

Early life and education
Kovrigina was born in Urals in 1910 into a Russian family. In 1924 she joined the local Komsomol and became its secretary  after three years. 

In 1931 Kovrigina graduated from the worker's school. She obtained a degree in medicine. During her studies she joined the Communist Party.

Career
Following her graduation Kovrigina began to work in Chelyabinsk and then was made the chief of staff of the regional department of health and education there. In September 1942 she was named the deputy minister of health, In this capacity she was responsible for the policies about the mother-child health. In 1950, she was appointed the minister of health which she held until 1957. When she was in office she managed to pass a law which lifted the prohibition of abortion in 1955. Then Kovrigina served as the director of the department of pathology at the Moscow Central Postgraduate Medical School.

Party career and views
Kovrigina was a member of the central committee of the Communist Party and had a Stalinist and anti-semitic stance. She was also part of the Soviet Women’s Anti-Fascist Committee which was established in 1941 to support the gender equality project in the Soviet Union.

Personal life and death
Kovrigina died in Moscow in 1995.

Awards
Kovrigina was awarded a medal for her activities in the siege of Leningrad during World War II.

References

External links

20th-century Russian women politicians
1910 births
1995 deaths
Soviet Ministers of Health
Central Committee of the Communist Party of the Soviet Union members
Russian women physicians